This is a list of past and present international animation festivals. These festivals include only animation and accept submissions from around the world. They often show an international program of independent, student, and commercial work. They may or may not be competitive. Some are touring festivals which are not based in a single city.

Notes

References

External links 

 Animation-Festivals.com website
 Zippy Frames website

 
International animation festivals
Animation
Animation